was an East Japan Railway Company (JR East) railway station located in Aoba-ku, Sendai, Japan. It was opened on 21 March 1987. Services were suspended on 1 October 2003, and from 2003 until its official closure in 2014, it was not served by any trains.

Line
 Senzan Line

History
The station opened on March 21, 1987. On October 1, 2003, train services to the station were discontinued. The station was officially closed as of March 15, 2014 (March 14 being the last day).

Surrounding area
Sendai Hi-Land Resort

References

See also

 List of railway stations in Japan

Railway stations in Sendai
Defunct railway stations in Japan
Senzan Line
Railway stations in Japan opened in 1987
Railway stations closed in 2003
Railway stations closed in 2014